Governor White may refer to:

 Albert B. White (1856–1941), 11th Governor of West Virginia
 Benjamin F. White (Montana politician) (1833–1920), 9th Governor of Montana Territory
 Edward Douglass White Sr. (1795–1847), 10th Governor of Louisiana
 Enrique White (1741–1811), 3rd Governor of West Florida from 1793 to 1795 and 4th Governor of East Florida from 1796 to 1811
 Frank White (North Dakota politician) (1856–1940), 8th Governor of North Dakota
 Frank D. White (1933–2003), 41st Governor of Arkansas
 George White (British Army officer) (1835–1912), Governor of Gibraltar from 1900 to 1905
 George White (Ohio politician) (1872–1953), 52nd Governor of Ohio
 Horace White (1865–1943), 37th Governor of New York
 Hugh L. White (1881–1965), 45th and 50th Governor of Mississippi
 Hugo White (1939–2014), Governor of Gibraltar from 1995 to 1997
 John White (colonist and artist) (1540s–1590s), Governor of failed Roanoke Colony
 Mark White (Texas politician) (1940–2017), 43rd Governor of Texas

See also
 William Pinkney Whyte (1824–1908), 35th Governor of Maryland